David Bangala (born 14 June 1997) is a Congolese professional footballer who plays as a defender for Cove Rangers, on loan from Ayr United.

Club career

FK Pohronie
After over 5 years in French lower divisions, in August 2020, Bangala had joined Slovak top division club FK Pohronie, citing great pleasure over the two-year deal, particularly considering troubles and difficulties in the previous seasons.

At the beginning of the season Bangala had replaced Ján Hatok, who had left the squad despite being a crucial part of the team in the 2019–20 season, playing as a right back. Bangala, however, came to be utilised as a defensive midfielder instead. He made his competitive Fortuna Liga debut during an away fixture of the first round of the season at ViOn Aréna, on 8 August 2020, against ViOn Zlaté Moravce. Through Fadera and Weir late in the second half Pohronie managed to get a point from the match after a 2:2 tie.

On 20 February, during a narrow 0:1 defeat at Tehelné pole against Slovan Bratislava, Bangala suffered a knee injury requiring a surgery, which had removed him from action from most of the remaining fixtures of the season.

Ayr United
In June 2022, Bangala joined Ayr United on a two-year contract, following the relegation of Pohronie to Slovak second division.

Personal life
As a teenager, Bangala was orphaned and had to help raise his younger sister.

References

External links
 
 
 Futbalnet profile  

1997 births
Living people
Footballers from Kinshasa
French footballers
Democratic Republic of the Congo emigrants to France
French expatriate footballers
Association football defenders
CMS Oissel players
Valenciennes FC players
Stade Briochin players
ESM Gonfreville players
FK Pohronie players
Ayr United F.C. players
Championnat National 3 players
Slovak Super Liga players
Scottish Professional Football League players
Expatriate footballers in Slovakia
French expatriate sportspeople in Slovakia
Expatriate footballers in Scotland
French expatriate sportspeople in Scotland

Cove Rangers F.C. players